Edward John Hack (1 October 1913 – 20 September 1987), was a cricketer who played one first-class match for Somerset in 1937. He was born in Long Ashton, Somerset, England,

Hack batted at No 8 in the first Somerset innings of the match against Lancashire at Old Trafford, and did not bat in the second innings of a drawn game. Cricket websites agree that he batted right-handed, but do not indicate a bowling style: however, the record of a Somerset Second Eleven match from 1939 in which Hack took wickets suggests that he may have been an all-rounder. In his one first-class match, he did not bowl. A book published in 2017 states that Hack was regarded in his club cricket career for Clevedon Cricket Club primarily as a batsman, and often opened the batting, but he did also bowl and, on occasion, he kept wicket.

External links
Edward Hack at www.cricketarchive.com

References

1913 births
1987 deaths
English cricketers
Somerset cricketers